WKNA (98.3 FM), formerly WLGN-FM, is a radio station licensed to Logan, Ohio.  Like its sister station, WLGN which broadcasts an oldies format, the station is owned by WLGN, LLC.

History

WLGN-FM signed on the air in 1965 and was licensed on February 10, 1966.

On September 11, 2008, WLGN-FM became WKNA. In 2011, the station flipped from country to variety hits, branded as "98.3 Sam FM".

External links
98.3 Sam FM Website

KNA